Andrianavoay (meaning "noble crocodile" in Malagasy) is an extinct genus of teleosauroid from the Bathonian (in the Middle Jurassic) Kandreho Formation of Madagascar.

The type species, A. baroni, was originally named "Steneosaurus" baroni by ET Newton in 1893 on the basis of a partial skull listed as "NHMUK PV R 1999", and an associated osteoderm from Andranosamonta, Madagascar. In her unpublished 2019 thesis, Michela Johnson coined the nomen (ex dissertatione) Andrianavoay for S. baroni. The genus name was published in 2020.

References 

Thalattosuchians
Toarcian life
Jurassic reptiles of Africa
Jurassic Madagascar
Fossils of Madagascar
Fossil taxa described in 2020
Prehistoric pseudosuchian genera